The Jury's Secret is a 1938 American drama film directed by Edward Sloman and starring Kent Taylor, Fay Wray, and Jane Darwell.

Cast
Kent Taylor as Walter Rusell
Fay Wray as Linda Ware
Jane Darwell as Mrs. Sheldon
Nan Grey as Mary Norris
Larry J. Blake as Bill Sheldon
Fritz Leiber (Sr.) as John Morrow
Leonard Mudie as District Attorney
Samuel S. Hinds as Brandon Williams
Granville Bates as Judge Pendegast
Halliwell Hobbes as John
Edward Broadley as William's Butler
Ted Osborne as Reporter Thompson
William B. Davidson as Page

References

External links

1938 films
American courtroom films
American black-and-white films
1938 drama films
American drama films
Films directed by Edward Sloman
1930s American films